Ge Ge Pearson (born Virginia Pearson; April 19, 1917 – June 19, 1975) was an American radio and television actress. She appeared in various cartoons, radio, and television shows.

Pearson's father had a traveling stock theater company. She debuted with that troupe when she was 2 years old and continued acting with it for the next 12 years.

On radio, Pearson played Mrs. Willy Lump Lump on The Red Skelton Show and Daisy Mulligan on The Gallant Heart, both on NBC.

On television, Pearson was the voice of Crusader Rabbit in the second series of the show of that title.

Personal life
On December 31, 1943, Pearson married Hal Gerard at El Rancho Vegas.

Filmography
 Looney Tunes
 The Magilla Gorilla Show
 The Bugs n' Daffy Show
 That's Warner Bros
 Space Angel
 Top Cat
 The Huckleberry Hound Show
 Tales of Wells Fargo
 Crusader Rabbit
 Ethel Barrymore Theatre
 Damon Runyon Theater
 I Love Lucy
 Lux Video Theatre
 Mr. & Mrs. North
 Hollywood Theatre Time
 Groan and Grunt
 Campus Rhythm

Radio
 The Red Skelton Show
 Amos 'n' Andy
 My Favorite Husband
 On Stage
 Let George Do It
 The Amazing Mr. Malone
 The Man Called X

References

External links
 
 

1917 births
1975 deaths
Actresses from Utah
American radio actresses
American television actresses
20th-century American actresses